Bob Wilson (1 July 1926 – 29 March 1985) was a former Scotland international rugby union player. Wilson played as a Prop.

Rugby career

Amateur career

Wilson played for Gala.South of Scotland, Barbarians and Scotland.
A fine exponent of the 7s game and part of the Gala 7 who won a number of tournaments on the Borders 7s circuit in the early 1950s. He also played for Gala at the Middlesex 7s.

Provincial career

Wilson played for South.He captained the South against the All Blacks in 1953. He played in the 1953–54 Scottish Inter-District Championship - the very first Scottish Inter-District Championship - and captained the side against Glasgow District.He played for the Barbarians in the 1952 Easter Tour of Wales.

International career

He was capped for  8 times between 1951 and 1953, playing in 7 Five Nations matches and he was also capped playing against .

References

1926 births
1985 deaths
Gala RFC players
Rugby union players from Galashiels
Rugby union props
Scotland international rugby union players
Scottish rugby union players
South of Scotland District (rugby union) players